Bed of roses is an English expression that represents a carefree life. This idiomatic expression is still popular.

In the thirteenth-century work Le Roman de la Rose (called  "The French Iliad" in Brewer's Dictionary of Phrase and Fable), a Lover recounts his dream of touring a garden and finding a beautiful bed of roses by the Fountain of Love. 

The expression is also used by later poets. Here is a line in Christopher Marlowe's poem The Passionate Shepherd to His Love. This was published posthumously in 1599; Marlowe died in 1593, stabbed to death

And I will make thee beds of roses
And a thousand fragrant posies,
A cap of flowers, and a kirtle
Embroidered all with leaves of myrtle;

In popular culture
Bed of Roses (1996 film)—A 1996 romance film
"Bed of Roses"—A 1989 Mondo Rock (Ross Wilson) song
"Bed of Roses"—A 1993 Bon Jovi song
"Bed of Rose's"—A 1971 Statler Brothers song
Bed of Roses (1933 film)—A 1933 comedy film
"Bed of Roses"—A song by Mindless Self Indulgence
Bed of Roses (TV series)—An Australian television drama series
"A Bed of Roses", a poem by Patti Smith from her 1996 book The Coral Sea
 A single by 1990s Grunge band Screaming Trees from the 1991 Studio album Uncle Anesthesia.
 Bed of Roses - a 2009 book, author Nora Roberts

References

English phrases
English-language idioms